The Ultra Machine is a batting toy made by Nintendo and designed by Gunpei Yokoi in 1967.

History 

It is part of Nintendo's Ultra toy series, which includes the Ultra Hand and the Ultra Scope. It launches soft balls that are to be hit with a bat. It sold over a million units. It was released elsewhere as the Slugger Mate.

Another version known as the Ultra Machine Deluxe was released in 1977.

Games 
The Ultra Machine appears in  both WarioWare, Inc.: Mega Microgame$! for the Game Boy Advance and WarioWare: Smooth Moves for the Wii, as a boss fight in the former and a regular microgame in the latter. It appears in some Mario Party games such as Mario Party 5. It also makes an appearance as a piece of furniture in Animal Crossing: New Leaf for 3DS. The Ultra Machine also makes a major appearance in the 3DS game Rusty's Real Deal Baseball. The game features characters with Ultra Machine shaped heads, and, in a few instances, flat out Ultra Machines. In Splatoon 2 for the Nintendo Switch, the Bomb Launcher special weapon also resembles the Ultra Machine.

See also
Ultra Hand
List of Nintendo products
Pitching machine

References

External links

1960s toys
Nintendo toys